The Communauté de communes Terroir de Caux is a communauté de communes in the Seine-Maritime département and in the Normandy région of France. It was formed on 1 January 2017 by the merger of the former Communauté de communes des Trois Rivières, Communauté de Communes Saâne et Vienne, Communauté de communes de Varenne et Scie and 3 communes from the former Communauté de communes du Bosc d'Eawy on 1 January 2017. Its seat is in Bacqueville-en-Caux. Its area is 489.3 km2, and its population was 37,872 in 2019.

Composition
The communauté de communes consists of the following 79 communes:

Ambrumesnil
Anneville-sur-Scie
Auppegard
Auzouville-sur-Saâne
Avremesnil
Bacqueville-en-Caux
Beautot
Beauval-en-Caux
Belleville-en-Caux
Belmesnil
Bertreville-Saint-Ouen
Bertrimont
Biville-la-Baignarde
Biville-la-Rivière
Le Bois-Robert
Brachy
Bracquetuit
Calleville-les-Deux-Églises
Le Catelier
Les Cent-Acres
La Chapelle-du-Bourgay
La Chaussée
Criquetot-sur-Longueville
Cropus
Crosville-sur-Scie
Dénestanville
Étaimpuis
La Fontelaye
Fresnay-le-Long
Gonnetot
Gonneville-sur-Scie
Greuville
Gruchet-Saint-Siméon
Gueures
Gueutteville
Hermanville
Heugleville-sur-Scie
Imbleville
Lamberville
Lammerville
Lestanville
Lintot-les-Bois
Longueil
Longueville-sur-Scie
Luneray
Manéhouville
Montreuil-en-Caux
Muchedent
Notre-Dame-du-Parc
Omonville
Ouville-la-Rivière
Quiberville
Rainfreville
Royville
Saâne-Saint-Just
Saint-Crespin
Saint-Denis-d'Aclon
Saint-Denis-sur-Scie
Sainte-Foy
Saint-Germain-d'Étables
Saint-Honoré
Saint-Maclou-de-Folleville
Saint-Mards
Saint-Ouen-du-Breuil
Saint-Ouen-le-Mauger
Saint-Pierre-Bénouville
Saint-Vaast-du-Val
Saint-Victor-l'Abbaye
Sassetot-le-Malgardé
Thil-Manneville
Tocqueville-en-Caux
Torcy-le-Grand
Torcy-le-Petit
Tôtes
Val-de-Saâne
Val-de-Scie
Varneville-Bretteville
Vassonville
Vénestanville

References

Terroir de Caux
Terroir de Caux